Dorcadion pseudonobile is a species of beetle in the family Cerambycidae. It was described by Stephan von Breuning in 1946. It is known from Iran.

References

pseudonobile
Beetles described in 1946